Maiky Jordan de la Cruz Borja (born 13 August 2004) is an Ecuadorian footballer who currently plays as a left-back for Stade de Reims.

Club career
Born in Cuenca, Ecuador, de la Cruz started his career with local side C.D. Cuenca at the age of eight, before joining L.D.U. Quito. While at Quito, he was named by English newspaper The Guardian as one of the best players born in 2004 worldwide.

Having made one appearance for Quito, he was linked with a move to French side Stade de Reims in February 2022. He made the move official in August of the same year, signing a four-year contract.

Personal life
De La Cruz is the nephew of former footballer Ulises de la Cruz.

Career statistics

Club

Notes

References

2004 births
Living people
People from Cuenca, Ecuador
Ecuadorian footballers
Ecuador youth international footballers
Association football fullbacks
Ecuadorian Serie A players
Championnat National 2 players
C.D. Cuenca footballers
L.D.U. Quito footballers
Stade de Reims players
Ecuadorian expatriate footballers
Ecuadorian expatriate sportspeople in France
Expatriate footballers in France